Clyde is an unincorporated community and census-designated place (CDP) located in Franklin Township, in Somerset County, New Jersey, United States. It was a station stop on the Penna RR's Millstone Branch. As of the 2010 United States Census, the CDP's population was 213.

Geography
According to the United States Census Bureau, Clyde had a total area of 0.383 square miles (0.993 km2), all of which was land.

Demographics

Census 2010

References

Census-designated places in Somerset County, New Jersey
Franklin Township, Somerset County, New Jersey